Daniel Guy Johnson (born 3 September 1977) is a Scottish Labour politician who has served as the Member of the Scottish Parliament (MSP) for the Edinburgh Southern constituency since 2016.

Early life 
Johnson was born on 3 September 1977. He was educated at Bonaly Primary School and at Stewart's Melville College. He joined the Labour Party at the age of 17. He graduated from the University of St Andrews in philosophy and from the University of Strathclyde in management.

Johnson's first job after leaving university was working as a constituency caseworker for Edinburgh South's MP Nigel Griffiths. He later went on to work as a management consultant for Accenture. Prior his election, he became managing director of the Paper Tiger and Studio One group of shops. The group became the first independent retailer in Edinburgh to become an accredited Living Wage employer in 2015.

Political career 
In January 2014, Johnson was selected by party members as a candidate for Edinburgh Southern prior to the 2016 Scottish Parliament election. He was elected to the Scottish Parliament in May 2016, gaining the seat from the Scottish National Party. He became shadow education minister for Scottish Labour in May 2016.

In December 2017, Johnson was promoted to the Shadow Cabinet as Justice Spokesperson. He resigned on 28 May 2019, the day after it was confirmed Scottish Labour had finished fifth in Scotland in the European Parliament elections and lost both its Scottish MEPs. He criticised the Labour Party's "direction and leadership" and noted Labour had finished sixth in Edinburgh. He challenged the party's Brexit policies, stating in his resignation letter he thought Labour should endorse a second referendum and campaign for remaining in the European Union.

In September 2020, Daniel Johnson called for Richard Leonard to resign as Scottish Labour leader, saying "Continuing like this will be disastrous for our party and is why I no longer have confidence in Richard Leonard’s leadership." After Leonard's resignation, Johnson nominated Anas Sarwar in the 2021 Scottish Labour leadership election. In March 2021, he was put back on to the front bench as the Finance Spokesperson for the Scottish Labour Party.

Protection of Workers (Retail and Age-Restricted Goods and Services) (Scotland) Bill 

In 2018, Johnson lodged a private member's bill which aimed to protect workers selling age restricted products. The Bill aimed to address increasing violence and abuse that shopworkers face, by introducing a new offence to protect workers and deter potential offenders. As retail workers who enforce a statutory age restriction are upholding the law in the wider public interest, it was argued that this group of workers needed further legal protection to help them carry out their duty.
The Bill proposed a new statutory offence for assaulting, threatening or abusing a retail worker, and proposed a statutory aggravation to that offence where the retail worker is enforcing a statutory age restriction.

On the 18 September 2020, the Scottish Government indicated that they would be supporting the progress of the bill throughout parliament, a significant win for Johnson. The Bill was passed in January 2021.

Personal life 
Johnson resides in the constituency with his wife, Jackie, and two daughters.

In 2017, Johnson revealed to Scottish Parliament that he had been diagnosed with attention deficit hyperactivity disorder (ADHD) later in life at the age of 35.

References

External links 
 

1977 births
Living people
People educated at Stewart's Melville College
Alumni of the University of St Andrews
Alumni of the University of Strathclyde
Labour MSPs
Members of the Scottish Parliament 2016–2021
Members of the Scottish Parliament 2021–2026
Members of the Scottish Parliament for Edinburgh constituencies
Place of birth missing (living people)
Politicians from Edinburgh